Charles Caesar (21 November 1673 – 2 April 1741) of Benington, Hertfordshire was a British Member of Parliament, a lawyer, a Tory and a Jacobite.

Early life

Charles Caesar was the son of Sir Charles Caesar of Benington. He was educated at St Catharine's College, Cambridge and admitted at the Middle Temple in 1690. He succeeded his father to the Benington estate in 1694.

Political career
He entered Parliament in 1701 as member for Hertford. This was a borough where his family had considerable influence, but where there was an ongoing dispute over the franchise (the main bone of contention being whether non-resident freemen of the town were entitled to vote). Almost every election ended in a petition to the House of Commons against the result, and the usual outcome was that the cases were decided for partisan reasons rather than on the merits of the case. In 1708, Caesar was defeated at the general election by one Sir Thomas Clarke, and petitioned against the result, though he withdrew his petition before any decision had been reached.

He regained his seat in 1710, and served as Treasurer of the Navy in the Earl of Oxford's administration from 1711 to 1714, being turned out of office on the Hanoverian succession. At the general election of 1715 the Whigs secured a majority and although Caesar was re-elected for Hertford, his opponents (Clarke again being one) petitioned against him, alleging bribery and other illegal practices, and the result was overturned. Though temporarily out of Parliament, Caesar remained active in Tory politics and was a close associate of Oxford, being an intermediary in his attempt to enlist the support of Charles XII of Sweden for the Jacobite cause.

At the next election, in 1722, Caesar again saw his election overturned, sitting for only a few months before the committee deemed him not to have duly elected, and seated Sir Thomas Clarke once more. However, after this setback Caesar stood instead for the county at the following election, and sat as Hertfordshire's MP for most of the rest of his life.

Private life
He died in 1741 in financial difficulties, having built a new house at Benington which burnt down within a short time. He had married, in 1702, Mary, the daughter of Ralph Freman of Aspenden Hall, Hertfordshire and had 2 sons and 2 daughters. The Benington estate was sold by trustees to Sir John Chesshyre in 1744 and the bulk of the remaining monies given to the eldest son Charles to reestablish a family seat.

References

Robert Beatson, A Chronological Register of Both Houses of Parliament (London: Longman, Hurst, Res & Orme, 1807) 
 Eveline Cruickshanks, "Religion and Royal Succession - The Rage of Party" in Clyve Jones (ed.), Britain in the First Age of Party: Essays Presented to Geoffrey Holmes (London: Continuum International, 1987)
 T. H. B. Oldfield, The Representative History of Great Britain and Ireland (London: Baldwin, Cradock & Joy, 1816)
 Robert Walcott, English Politics in the Early Eighteenth Century (Oxford: Oxford University Press, 1956)
 
 Office-Holders: Navy Treasurer

1673 births
1741 deaths
People from Benington, Hertfordshire
Alumni of St Catharine's College, Cambridge
Members of the Middle Temple
English MPs 1701
English MPs 1701–1702
English MPs 1702–1705
English MPs 1705–1707
Members of the Parliament of Great Britain for Hertfordshire
British MPs 1707–1708
British MPs 1710–1713
British MPs 1713–1715
British MPs 1722–1727
British MPs 1727–1734
British MPs 1734–1741
English people of Italian descent
Tory members of the Parliament of Great Britain